The 2023 Osaka Prefecture Gubernatorial election is scheduled to be held on 9 April 2023 as part of the 20th unified local elections.

Summary 
The term of current Osaka Governorn Yoshimura Hirofumi will end on 6 April 2023 and the election is scheduled for the end of his term of office.

Date of Public Notice / Date of Execution/Other info 
Date of Official Announcement: 23 March 2023

Election Date: 9 April 2023

To be held in conjunction with elections for the Osaka City Assembly, and the Osaka Prefectural Gubernatorial and Prefectural Assembly.

Other Osaka Elections on 9 April 
Osaka Prefectural Assembly, Osaka City Mayoral, Osaka City Council, Sakai City Council

Declared Candidates

Timeline

2022. 

 December 20 - Incumbent Yoshimura announces his candidacy for re-election at a meeting of the Osaka Restoration Association

2023. 

 January 7 - The "Association for Creating a Bright Democratic Osaka Prefecture", a citizens' group formed by the Japanese Communist Party and labor unions, announces that it will endorse Kotaro Tatsumi, a former member of the House of Councillors from the Japanese Communist Party. It was also announced that the JCP intends to endorse him. On the same day, Tatsumi announced his candidacy at a press conference.
 February 5 - It was reported that the political group "Update Osaka" planned to endorse Mayumi Taniguchi, a law scholar and visiting associate professor at Osaka University of Arts. On February 8, Taniguchi officially announced her candidacy 
 February 21 - It was reported that the NHK Party was working on the candidacy of Sayaka Sato, a pharmacist 
 February 24 - The Sangen Party announced the candidacy of Toshiaki Yoshino, a dentist
 February 27 - The political group New Party Kumori announced the candidacy of Hideya Inagaki, a writer
 February 27 - The NHK party announced that it would endorse Sato, but rescinded its endorsement of Sato the following day on February 28
 March 7 - Sato officially announced her candidacy at a press conference; on March 9, the Political Women 48 Party (formerly the NHK Party) announced it would endorse Sato

References 

Elections in Osaka Prefecture
2023 elections in Japan